Design Exchange Format (DEF) is an open specification for representing physical layout of an integrated circuit in an ASCII format. It represents the netlist and circuit layout. DEF is used in conjunction with Library Exchange Format (LEF) to represent complete physical layout of an  integrated circuit while it is being designed. 

DEF was developed by Cadence Design Systems.

DEF files are usually generated by place and route (P&R) tools and are used as an input for post analysis tools, such as extraction tools or power analysis tools.

External links
LEF/DEF 5.5 Language Reference, Product Version 5.5, Internet Archive
 
LEF/DEF 5.6 Language Reference from Cadence Design Systems, Internet Archive

LEF/DEF 5.7 Language Reference from cadence Design Systems, Internet Archive

LEF/DEF 5.8 Language Reference from cadence Design Systems, Internet Archive

EDA file formats